A solar eclipse occurs when parts of the Earth is in a shadow cast.

Solar eclipse may also refer to:

Solar Eclipse (video game), a 1995 video game
"Solar Eclipse", a song by YoungBoy Never Broke Again from the album Until Death Call My Name

See also
List of solar eclipses

Eclipse of the Sun (disambiguation)